Varzob District is a district in Tajikistan, lying north of Dushanbe. It is one of the Districts of Republican Subordination. It borders on the city of Hisor from the west, Rudaki District from the south, and the city of Vahdat from the east. The Gissar Range runs along its northern edge. The river Varzob traverses the entire district north to south. The district capital is the village Varzob. The population of the district is 82,200 (January 2020 estimate).

Beside the river, grows a native species of Iris vicaria, and Iris hoogiana.

Administrative divisions
They are as follows:

Notes

References

Districts of Tajikistan